The Municipality of Ashfield was a local government area in the Inner West of Sydney, New South Wales, Australia. The municipality was proclaimed on 28 December 1871 as the "Borough of Ashfield", which changed to the "Municipality of Ashfield" in 1906. On 12 May 2016, Ashfield merged with Marrickville Council and the Municipality of Leichhardt to form the Inner West Council.

The last mayor of the municipality was councillor Lucille McKenna, a member of the Australian Labor Party.

In December 2021, a majority of voters in Inner West Council voted in favour of reversing the 2016 merger and separating the three pre-existing councils of Ashfield, Leichhardt and Marrickville.

Suburbs 
The municipality comprised the following suburbs and localities:
 Ashfield
 Dobroyd Point
 Haberfield
 Summer Hill

It also included parts of:
 Ashbury (shared with City of Canterbury)
 Croydon (shared with Municipality of Burwood)
 Hurlstone Park (shared with City of Canterbury)
 Croydon Park (shared with City of Canterbury and the Municipality of Burwood

Council history
The "Borough of Ashfield" was proclaimed in the New South Wales Government Gazette on 28 December 1871 and was originally divided into two wards, North Ward and South Ward.
Local issues in the area, before the forced merge into Inner West Council, included the redevelopment of Ashfield Mall and concerns about overdevelopment in general; construction of the M4 East tunnel because it might lead to increased traffic and pollution; and the general state of the commercial area, which one councillor labelled 'Trashfield'. Also contentious was Ashfield Council itself. In 2003, it was described by the Daily Telegraph as one of the worst councils in Sydney after one councillor took out a restraining order against another. By 2008, another councillor was sacked for not being a bona fide resident of the municipality while other councillors had made outspoken comments on issues such as the Iraq War, bird flu, the Monarchy and 30 km/h speed limits within residential areas. In 2009, Councillor Nick Adams was given a six-month suspension from the Liberal Party of Australia for conduct deemed likely to "embarrass or cause damage to" the Party during an altercation with a journalist.

On 12 May 2016, Ashfield merged with Marrickville Council and the Municipality of Leichhardt to form the Inner West Council.

Demographics 
At the 2011 Census, there were 41,214 people in the Ashfield local government area, of these 48.6% were male and 51.4% were female. Aboriginal and Torres Strait Islander people made up 0.6% of the population. The median age of people in the Municipality of Ashfield was 37 years. Children aged 0 – 14 years made up 15.1% of the population and people aged 65 years and over made up 14.4% of the population. Of people in the area aged 15 years and over, 45.1% were married and 10.0% were either divorced or separated.

Population growth in The Municipality of Ashfield between the 2001 Census and the 2006 Census was 1.76%; while in the subsequent five years to the 2011 Census, population growth was 3.90%. When compared with total population growth of Australia for the same periods, being 5.78% and 8.32% respectively, population growth in Ashfield local government area was significantly less than the national average. The median weekly income for residents within the Municipality of Ashfield of was generally on par with the national average.

At the 2011 Census, the proportion of residents in Ashfield local government area who stated their ancestry as Chinese was in excess of four times the state and national averages; and the proportion of households where an Asian language was spoken at home was about six times higher than the national average.

Council

Final composition and election method

The former Ashfield Municipal Council was generally considered a safe Labor area. As the attached table shows, Labor outpolled all other parties in the area at the final federal, state and council elections before the merge. However, the Liberals and Greens had strong voices in the area with the Council electing a member of the Greens Party as mayor and the northern part of Ashfield was represented by a Liberal Party member in the NSW Parliament. Prior to the 1970s, the area was more conservative, generally returning members who were Free Trade, Nationalist, UAP or Liberal although it wasn't unheard of for Labor members to get elected during this period.

The final council was composed of four Labor councillors, four independents and four Liberals. The last mayor was Lucille McKenna, the Council's first woman mayor. 

Ashfield Municipal Council was composed of twelve Councillors elected proportionally as four separate wards, each electing three Councillors. All Councillors were elected for a fixed four-year term of office. The Mayor and Deputy Mayor were elected for a one-year term by the Councillors at the first meeting of the Council in September. The last election was held on 13 September 2012, and the makeup of the Council for the term 2012–16, in order of election by ward, was as follows:

Mayors

Coat of arms and logo

Logo
Ashfield Council launched a new logo and branding in August 2008, described as an "urban map" of various images representing various buildings and forms in the local area. This branding remained in use (with the arms retained for the most formal uses) until the council's amalgamation.

References

External links 
 Ashfield Municipal Council

Ashfield
1871 establishments in Australia
Ashfield
Inner West
Ashfield, New South Wales